Steven Michael Parris (born December 17, 1967), is a former Major League Baseball pitcher for four teams from 1995-2003. He played for 14 years, including his time in the minors.

Amateur career
Parris attended Joliet West High School in Joliet, Illinois and the University of St. Francis. In 1988, he played collegiate summer baseball in the Cape Cod Baseball League for the Yarmouth-Dennis Red Sox.

He was drafted in the 5th round of the 1989 Major League Baseball draft by the Philadelphia Phillies.

Professional career
His best major league season was 1999, when he posted an 11-4 record with a 3.50 ERA for the Cincinnati Reds. That year, Parris got the start in Cincinnati's one-game playoff against the New York Mets to determine final playoff spot in the National League. He was the losing pitcher in a 5-0 Reds loss, eliminating the team from the playoffs.

References

External links

1967 births
Living people
Major League Baseball pitchers
Pittsburgh Pirates players
Cincinnati Reds players
Toronto Blue Jays players
Tampa Bay Devil Rays players
Baseball players from Illinois
Sportspeople from Joliet, Illinois
St. Francis Fighting Saints baseball players
Yarmouth–Dennis Red Sox players